Luigi Poletti may refer to:

 Luigi Poletti (architect) (1792–1869), Italian neoclassical architect
 Luigi Poletti (mathematician) (1864–1967), Italian mathematician and poet